Daniel Hamhuis (born December 13, 1982) is a Canadian former professional ice hockey defenceman who played in the National Hockey League (NHL). He was drafted in 2001 by the Nashville Predators.

Hamhuis played major junior hockey with the Prince George Cougars of the Western Hockey League (WHL) and was selected 12th overall by the Nashville Predators in the 2001 NHL Entry Draft. The following year, he was awarded the Bill Hunter Memorial Trophy and Four Broncos Memorial Trophy as the league's best defenceman and player of the year, respectively; he would also be named the top defenceman in the Canadian Hockey League (CHL), the governing body of major junior hockey in Canada. After a final season in the WHL, Hamhuis made his professional debut with the Milwaukee Admirals of the American Hockey League (AHL), a minor league affiliate of the Predators. He made his NHL debut the next year for Nashville. After five seasons with the club, Hamhuis became an unrestricted free agent and signed a six-year contract with the Canucks. In his first year with the club, he helped Vancouver to the 2011 Stanley Cup Finals, where they lost to the Boston Bruins.

Hamhuis has played in several international tournaments at both the junior and senior levels for Canada. At the 2001 and 2002 World Junior Championships, he won a bronze and silver medal, respectively. He also appeared in four straight World Championships, winning a gold at the 2007 tournament and silver at both the 2008 and 2009 tournaments. On January 7, 2014, he was named to the 2014 Canadian Olympic Hockey Team, winning a gold medal at the 2014 Winter Olympics.

Playing career

Prince George Cougars
Hamuis suffered a broken tibia during his junior draft-eligible season, limiting his exposure to WHL scouts. Consequently, he went unselected in the WHL Bantam Draft.
He later admitted to not even being aware of the junior draft until a couple months later. The Prince George Cougars later put Hamhuis on their protected list and he went on to make his junior debut in 1998–99. He recorded a goal and four points over 56 games while being named both Prince George's rookie and scholastic player of the year. The following season, he improved to 10 goals and 33 points in 70 games.  He helped Prince George advance to the Conference Finals, scoring two goals and five points in a junior career-high of 13 post-season games. He was also named the Cougars' scholastic player for the year for the second year in a row.

Hamhuis' third WHL season in 2000–01 saw him increase his offensive production to 13 goals and 59 points over 62 games, eighth in scoring among league defencemen. He received WHL West First All-Star Team honours and was named Prince George's most dedicated player. Playing in his NHL draft-eligible season, he participated in the 2001 CHL Top Prospects Game, where he served as captain for his team. Hamhuis was ranked by the NHL Central Scouting Bureau as the second-best North American prospect overall (behind Jason Spezza) and the top defenceman. He went on to be selected with the 12th overall pick in the 2001 NHL Entry Draft by the Nashville Predators. He was the second defenceman to be selected after the Montreal Canadiens took Mike Komisarek seventh overall. Scouting reports listed him as a physical offensive defenceman with excellent skating, passing and open-ice hitting abilities, as well as a good hockey sense. Having identified his shot as a weaker aspect of his game, he worked on improving it during his junior years. His coach in Prince George likened his playing style to Scott Niedermayer.

Following his draft, Hamhuis attended his first NHL training camp, but was returned to the WHL as an early cut on September 19, 2001. Playing in his fourth season of junior, he recorded career-highs of 50 assists and 60 points in 59 games. At the end of the campaign, he was awarded the Bill Hunter Memorial Trophy and Four Broncos Memorial Trophy as the league's best defenceman and player of the year, respectively. It marked the first time a player had won both awards since Barry Beck in 1977. Hamhuis additionally received the CHL Defenceman of the Year Award and was named to the WHL West and CHL First All-Star Teams. He was also named Prince George's most valuable player. Hamhuis left Prince George as the club's all-time leader in assists with 123 (he was later surpassed by Blake Robson on January 28, 2003).

Nashville Predators

On July 7, 2002, Hamhuis was signed by the Predators. He was a late cut from Nashville's roster for the 2002–03 season and was assigned within the club's system to the Milwaukee Admirals of the AHL on October 3. He received a three-game suspension early in the season for an infraction during a game against the Utah Grizzlies. He went on to record six goals and 27 points over 68 games in his professional rookie campaign with the Admirals.

Hamhuis transitioned to the NHL the following season by making the Predators' line-up out of training camp. He scored his first NHL goal on October 16, 2003, a game winner on the powerplay against St. Louis Blues goaltender Chris Osgood; Nashville won the game 4–1. Late in the campaign, he recorded a five-point night (one goal and four assists) in a 9–4 win against the Pittsburgh Penguins on March 4, 2004. He finished the season with seven goals and 26 points over 82 games with Predators in 2003–04. He ranked tied for third in point-scoring and second in average ice time among the NHL's rookie defencemen. Hamhuis was also chosen to the 2004 NHL YoungStars Game, representing the Western Conference in a 7–3 win. Hamhuis helped the Predators make the playoffs for the first time in franchise history in his rookie season and added two assists in the club's first-round elimination to the Detroit Red Wings.

Due to the season-long NHL lock-out, Hamhuis returned to the AHL in 2004–05. Notching 13 goals and 51 points in 76 games, he was named to the AHL Second All-Star Team. He was also chosen to participate in the 2005 AHL All-Star Game for the Canadian team. With the NHL set to resume in 2005–06, the Predators re-signed Hamhuis to a one-year contract on August 16, 2005. Returning to Nashville, he went on to record a career-high seven goals, 31 assists and 38 points in 82 games. He led all Predators players in ice time and ranked second in plus-minus with a +11 rating.

Following his break-out season, the Predators and Hamhuis agreed to a four-year, $8 million contract on September 21, 2006. He earned $1.5 million in his first year of the deal, gradually increasing to $2.5 million in his fourth. His offensive production dipped to a career-low 20 points in the season following the signing. In 2007–08, he recorded four goals and 27 points over 80 games. Hamhuis scored his first Stanley Cup playoff goal in game four of the opening round against the Detroit Red Wings, a 3–2 win. However, Nashville lost the next two games and were eliminated. Hamhuis continued scoring at the same pace in the following two seasons, recording 26 and 24 points in 2008–09 and 2009–10, respectively.

Hamhuis' role with the Predators was diminished in his final few seasons in Nashville with the emergence of younger defencemen Shea Weber and Ryan Suter as the club's top two defencemen. With Weber and Suter providing most of the offence from the blueline, Hamhuis was used primarily as a shutdown defenceman, matching up against opposing team's top forward units and leading the club in shorthanded ice time, while seeing limited powerplay time.

As it became apparent that Hamhuis would not be re-signed by the Predators following the 2009–10 season, his negotiating rights were traded to the Philadelphia Flyers, along with a 2011 conditional draft pick, for Ryan Parent on June 19, 2010. Hamhuis and the Predators had been negotiating for most of the season, as well as in the summer, but Nashville was not willing to meet his asking price. After failing to agree to a contract with Philadelphia as well, his rights were traded once again to the Pittsburgh Penguins for a 2011 third-round pick on June 25; negotiations with the club were also unsuccessful.

Vancouver Canucks

On July 1, 2010, Hamhuis became an unrestricted free agent and signed a six-year, $27 million contract with the Vancouver Canucks. Growing up in Smithers, British Columbia, he was specifically interested in signing with the Canucks during his pending free agency, which factored into his decision to sign with neither Philadelphia nor Pittsburgh. The Canucks had reportedly tried to acquire Hamhuis previously at the 2009–10 trade deadline, with Nashville asking for prospect Cody Hodgson and a first-round draft pick in exchange. Several days prior to his free agency, the Canucks traded for defenceman Keith Ballard from the Florida Panthers, which initially led Hamhuis to believe the Canucks would be no longer interested in him. However, on July 1, the Canucks were one of ten teams to offer him a contract and he signed with the club despite more lucrative deals of up to $5 million in salary and terms of seven years.

Five games into the 2010–11 season, he suffered a bruised foot while blocking a shot during a contest against the Carolina Hurricanes on October 17, 2010. The injury caused him to miss eight games. After returning to the line-up, he scored his first goal as a Canuck – an empty-netter in the final minute of a 5–3 win against the Toronto Maple Leafs on November 13. Later in the season, Hamhuis suffered a concussion during a game against the Anaheim Ducks on February 9, 2011. After making a pass from behind his net, he received a bodycheck from opposing forward Ryan Getzlaf, causing him to hit his head on the boards. He lay motionless on the ice for several minutes before being helped to the Canucks' dressing room. While no penalty was called on the play, Hamhuis' teammates described the hit as a dirty play on Getzlaf's part after the game. Conversely, Canucks head coach Alain Vigneault told media it was a "good hit by a big player" and that Hamhuis "was watching his pass and should have been trying to protect himself." Speaking publicly of the injury for the first time 10 days later, Hamhuis said he did not deem the hit "dirty", but "unnecessary", given the "puck was...off [his] stick" and he was in a "vulnerable position". After returning to the line-up, he registered his first two-goal NHL game, including the overtime-winner, in a 4–3 win against the Phoenix Coyotes. Finishing the regular season with 6 goals and 23 points over 64 games, he helped the Canucks to the best record in the NHL, earning them the franchise's first ever Presidents' Trophy. He ranked third on the team in plus-minus (+29) and average ice time per game (22 minutes and 40 seconds). Entering the 2011 playoffs with the first seed in the West, the Canucks eliminated the Chicago Blackhawks, Nashville Predators and San Jose Sharks en route to the Stanley Cup Finals. During Game 1 of the series against the Boston Bruins, Hamhuis suffered a sports hernia, as well as groin and lower abdomen injuries, resulting from a hip check he delivered to opposing forward Milan Lucic; he was sidelined for the remainder of the Finals. Prior to his injury, Hamhuis played a significant role in the team's playoff run, forming a shutdown defensive pairing with Kevin Bieksa. The two led Vancouver in average ice time per game throughout the playoffs. It was revealed following the Canucks' Game 7 defeat to the Bruins that Hamhuis required off-season surgery.

Playing in his second season with Vancouver, Hamhuis recorded 4 goals and a career-high 33 assists for 37 points, one short of his personal best. He also led the Canucks in plus-minus with a +29 rating. His efforts helped Vancouver to a second consecutive Presidents' Trophy. Individually, he ranked 10th in Norris Trophy balloting with two second-place votes. In the 2012 playoffs, Hamhuis recorded three assists over five games as the Canucks were upset by the Los Angeles Kings in the first round.

He suffered major injuries in both of his final two seasons with Vancouver. On November 20, 2014 he tore his groin during a game against the Anaheim Ducks. On December 9, 2015 during a match against the New York Rangers, his face was struck by a Dan Boyle slapshot, breaking his jaw. Both injuries resulted in him missing two months' worth of games.

Dallas Stars
On July 1, 2016, after not being resigned by the Canucks, Hamhuis signed a two-year, $7.5 million contract with the Dallas Stars.

In 159 games with the Stars, Hamhuis recorded 40 total points.

Return to Nashville
On July 25, 2018, Hamhuis, as a free agent, signed a two-year, $2.5 million contract to return to the Nashville Predators, the team that originally drafted him in 2001.

In 57 games during the 2018-19 NHL season, Hamhuis recorded five assists. He had no points in six games of Nashville's first-round playoff series against his former team, the Dallas Stars who defeated the Predators to move on to Round 2.

On August 13, 2020, Hamhuis announced his retirement from the NHL after 16 seasons.

International play

Hamhuis played for the Canadian national junior team at the 2001 and 2002 World Junior Championships. He won a bronze medal with Canada in his first year at the tournament in Moscow, Russia, contributing an assist in seven games. The following year in Pardubice, Czech Republic, he recorded three points in six games, tying with for Carlo Colaiacovo for the team lead in scoring among defencemen. He was sidelined during the tournament with an injured shoulder, sustained after being hit from behind into the boards in a game against Russia. He returned to help Canada to a silver medal, losing in the gold medal game to Russia 5–4.

Four years later, Hamhuis was named to the Canadian men's team for the 2006 World Championships in Riga, Latvia – his first of four consecutive tournament appearances. Making his senior international debut, he led all Canadian defencemen with five points in nine games. Canada was shut out in the bronze medal game by Finland 5–0.

The following year, he was a late addition to Canada's roster on April 22, 2007, following the Predators' first-round playoff elimination. He was named to the team along with Predators teammate Shea Weber. Hamhuis went on to win his first international gold medal in a 4–2 final win against Finland in Moscow. He notched three points in nine games.

In 2008, Hamhuis and Canada made their second consecutive appearance in the gold medal game, but failed to defend their title in a 5–4 overtime loss to Russia. He ranked second behind Brent Burns on the team in average ice time with 17:47 minutes per game.

Canada faced Russia once again the following year in 2009, losing 2–1. Hamhuis scored four points in nine games while ranking second in average ice time among Canadian players, behind Nashville teammate Shea Weber.

Later that summer, Hamhuis was invited to Team Canada's 46-player orientation camp, held in Calgary for the 2010 Winter Olympics. He participated in the three-day camp in August 2009, but was not selected to the Olympic squad.

Following the Canucks' first-round elimination in the 2012 playoffs, Hamhuis was invited by Team Canada to that year's World Championships. With his third child on the way, however, he declined.

On January 7, 2014 Hamhuis was named to the Canadian Olympic team for the 2014 Sochi Olympic Winter Games.  Team Canada won the gold medal beating Sweden 3-0.

Personal life
Hamhuis was born and raised in Smithers, British Columbia, to parents Marty and Ida. He has two sisters, Erin and Cindy. His father and sisters also play hockey; Marty played senior hockey, while Erin and Cindy played in a local women's league. Hamhuis grew up in a Christian home with his family and has continued to profess this faith. Since joining the Canucks in 2010, he organized chapel services for his teammates to optionally attend.

Beginning to play organized hockey at the age of four, Hamhuis was competing against other players as old as eight years, as his hometown was not big enough to fill teams for younger age groups. He went to provincials four seasons in a row and won the title with his club, the Smithers Storm, in overtime during his last year of minor hockey. Future Predators teammate Cody Franson was a stick boy for Hamhuis' team, while another Nashville blueliner, Shea Weber, did the same for a competing team at provincial tournaments. Hamhuis grew up cheering for the Edmonton Oilers and Vancouver Canucks.

Hamhuis left home at the age of 15 to start playing junior with the Prince George Cougars. During his time there, he met his wife, Sarah. They have three daughters together.

Hamhuis is an owner of the Prince George Cougars franchise; he is part of the ownership group that also comprises fellow NHL player Eric Brewer and a team of local investors. The group's bid to purchase the team was approved by the WHL Board of Governors on April 30, 2014.

During his tenure with the Canucks, Hamhuis was also heavily involved with the team's community initiatives. Most significantly, he served as a spokesperson for the Canucks Autism Network, a non-profit organization that provides sports and recreation programs for individuals and families living with autism in British Columbia.

Career statistics

Regular season and playoffs

International

Awards

WHL and CHL

AHL

References

External links

1982 births
Canadian ice hockey defencemen
Canadian people of Dutch descent
Dallas Stars players
Ice hockey people from British Columbia
Ice hockey players at the 2014 Winter Olympics
Living people
Medalists at the 2014 Winter Olympics
Milwaukee Admirals players
Nashville Predators draft picks
Nashville Predators players
National Hockey League first-round draft picks
Olympic gold medalists for Canada
Olympic ice hockey players of Canada
Olympic medalists in ice hockey
People from Smithers, British Columbia
Prince George Cougars players
Vancouver Canucks players